There are several institutions called the University of Benin in West Africa:

The National University of Benin, in Cotonou, Benin
The University of Benin (Nigeria) in Benin City, Nigeria
The University of Benin (Togo) in Lomé, Togo, now known as the University of Lomé